Congregation Beth Israel is a synagogue located in West Hartford, Connecticut.  The synagogue is one of the two oldest Jewish congregations in Connecticut and one of the largest Reform Jewish congregations in New England, with about 900 member families and about 2,000 individual members.

Its 1933 building, Temple Beth Israel, was listed on the U.S. National Register of Historic Places in 1995.

Beth Israel serves as a center for worship, education, and social programs.

Location 

Congregation Beth Israel is located at 701 Farmington Ave in West Hartford, Connecticut.

The congregation occupies a large building dominated by an enormous Byzantine dome. Inside are a sanctuary (upon which the dome is built), a chapel, a religious school, a pre-school, offices, two meeting halls, a small museum, and a library. Beautiful stained glass windows are present in both the sanctuary and the chapel. The building has been placed on the National Register of Historic Places by the U.S. government.

The congregation worships in a notable 1936 building by architect Charles R. Greco.  Built at the height of the Art Deco period, the Byzantine revival form in Art Deco style presents a majestic appearance.  In 2006, the congregation was given the West Hartford Historic Preservation Award for its meticulous restoration of the historic structure.

History

Founding and affiliation 
Beth Israel, which means "House of Israel" in Hebrew, was founded in 1843,  the year the Connecticut legislature first permitted public worship by Jews in the state.  Congregation Mishkan Israel was founded in the same year.  Congregation Beth Israel began as an Orthodox congregation, however, in part influenced by the immigration of German Jews to Hartford, the congregation quickly adopted Reform practices. In 1877, it joined with other American Reform Jewish congregations to form the Union of American Hebrew Congregations (which is now known as the Union for Reform Judaism), an umbrella support organization for American Reform Jewish congregations. Beth Israel continues to be a member of the Union for Reform Judaism.

First synagogue 

Congregation Beth Israel's first synagogue was built at 21 Charter Oak Ave. in Hartford in 1876. Though Beth Israel left the building in 1936, the building still stands and is occupied by the Charter Oak Cultural Center.  It is among the oldest synagogue buildings still standing in the United States.

Rabbi Feldman 
Beth Israel moved into its present location in 1936. For most of the middle of the 20th century (1925–1977), the congregation was led by Rabbi Abraham J. Feldman, a leading exponent of Classical Reform philosophy. One of the innovations that Rabbi Feldman brought to Congregation Beth Israel was the confirmation ceremony at age 16.

Feldman's influence was far reaching. He fostered a sense of community and was held in great respect by most, if not all, of the congregation. He focused on building a congregation that people stayed in for a long time and celebrated all their life events as a congregation. His long service as Rabbi meant that many people were born, confirmed, and married under his leadership. Indeed, even at the beginning of the 21st century, a number of older congregants would use his leadership and rabbinate as an example.

Rabbi Silver 
Rabbi Harold Silver succeeded Feldman in 1968. He would serve as senior rabbi for 25 years, retiring in 1993. Silver came from a family of rabbis. Five generations of his family before him served as rabbis. His father, Maxwell Silver, was a rabbi in New York City; his uncle, Abba Hillel Silver, was a rabbi in Cleveland, Ohio; and his grandfather, Moses Silver, was a rabbi in Jerusalem. Silver was ordained in 1951 at Hebrew Union College in New York City. Rabbi Silver's first rabbinate was as assistant rabbi at the Rodef Shalom Congregation in Pittsburgh. He went on to become rabbi at Temple Emanuel in Pittsburgh, Pennsylvania, where he served from 1955 until he came to Congregation Beth Israel in 1968.

Silver was prominent in the Hartford Jewish community. He organized the first Greater Hartford Rabbinical Board of Rabbis, which brought together rabbis from different Jewish congregations and movements. He also served on a variety of community boards, both Jewish and non-Jewish. Silver also promoted cross-religious interfaith dialogue, preaching at many local churches and encouraging peace and understanding between people of different faiths. Additionally, Silver taught Judaism courses at local universities. He hired Connecticut's first female associate rabbi, Jody Cohen, bringing her to Beth Israel in 1984.

Rabbi Silver retired in 1993 became rabbi emeritus (see Leadership). He died on March 9, 2017, at 92 years of age.

Rabbi Glaser 
Silver was succeeded by Rabbi Simeon Glaser, who has served as assistant rabbi at Congregation Beth Israel at the end of Rabbi Silver's tenure as senior rabbi. Glaser was particularly popular with young families and children because of his love, and evident talent, for music and song. Glaser put on exciting Purim and Simchas Torah holiday services in which he would team up with Cantor Green and Assistant Rabbi Weiss to sing, dance, and act out the stories of the holidays. After serving four years as senior rabbi, Glaser left Beth Israel, first to serve at a small Conservative synagogue in Wethersfield, Connecticut and then to Temple Israel in Minneapolis, Minnesota.

Soviet immigration 
During the 1990s, Congregation Beth Israel became instrumental in the absorption of hundreds of Jewish immigrants from the former Soviet Union. Early on, the New American Committee was formed to provide education assistance, licensure help, clothing acquisition assistance and help with the home needs of the new Americans. The New American Committee also continues to provide educational opportunities including lectures and weekly language classes (see Education). Congregation Beth Israel now has a large Russian speaking population and immigrants make up a significant demographic of the congregation.

Rabbi Fuchs 
Rabbi Stephen Fuchs became senior rabbi in 1997 (see Leadership).

Leadership 
Congregation Beth Israel, like most American Jewish congregations, is led by both a lay board and clergy.

Clergy 
Beth Israel has long had a clergy system consisting of a senior rabbi, an assistant rabbi, and a cantor. Occasionally, this system has changed to better reflect realities of the offices, such as when Rabbi Weiss held the title of assistant rabbi, then associate rabbi, and then simply rabbi (with no qualification) after serving the congregation for many years from the late 1990s until early the early 2000s. Additionally, the congregation now has the position of rabbi emeritus, occupied by the previous senior rabbi, Harold Silver.

Rabbi Stephen Lewis Fuchs became Rabbi Emeritus in 2011 when he was named President of the World Union of Progressive Judaism.  He had been senior rabbi since 1997, having previously served as senior rabbi of the Temple Congregation Ohabai Sholom in Nashville, Tennessee for 11 years. Rabbi Fuchs is the author of six books and is currently the spiritual leader of Bat Yam Temple of the Islands. in Sanibel Island, FL.

Michael Pincus is the current senior rabbi. Andi Fliegel is the current assistant rabbi. Stephanie Kupfer is the current cantor.

Lay leadership 
The lay leadership of Congregation Beth Israel set policy, hires clergy, and oversees the running of the congregation. The governing body is the board of trustees, which consists of approximately 30 active members of the congregation. The head of the board is the president, who is assisted by a number of vice-presidents, a treasurer, and a secretary. Additionally, the brotherhood president, sisterhood president, young families chair, youth group president, and the clergy sit on the board but mostly in an ex-officio capacity.

Officers 
The officers of the board of trustees are the president, vice-presidents, treasurer, and secretary.

The president is the head of the board of trustees and the lay leader of Congregation Beth Israel. It is his job to make sure the congregation continues to run smoothly and to spearhead any new projects that become necessary.

The vice-presidents assist the president. At any given time there are usually between three and five vice-presidents. Usually vice-presidents are long standing members of the board of trustees who have been particular active, often as committee chairs. It is common for vice-presidents to eventually become president, and they are often chosen to be vice-president with this in mind.

The treasurer is in charge of the finances and the secretary takes minutes at the meetings.

Committees 
The board of trustees has a number of committees that manage different aspects of the congregation. Some important committees include the Finance Committee, the Ritual Committee, and the Social Action Committee.

Worship

General practices 
Worship at Congregation Beth Israel follows Reform Jewish practices. Men and women sit and pray together. The service usually follows a variant on the traditional Jewish service, usually mixing English and Hebrew (the English usually, but not always, reflecting at least the meaning if not a literal translation of the Hebrew). Services usually use the Gates of Prayer, the New Union Prayer Book or the book, though occasionally the clergy will write or adapt another service.

Worship times 
The most popular regular service is the Friday night Shabbat service. It takes place in the sanctuary and is led by the clergy. Occasionally during the summer the service takes place outside instead. Over 100 people regularly attend these services.

The congregation also has Saturday morning Shabbat services, also in the sanctuary and led by the clergy. Usually the services follow Torah study, which takes place at the synagogue and is led by the clergy (see Education).

Beth Israel, like most Jewish congregations has special services for holidays. Hundreds of people annually attend the Rosh Hashanah and Yom Kippur services.

A daily minyan service is held in the chapel and is usually led by a lay person, though occasionally the clergy will lead.

Students of the Youth Education Program also attend a student and parent service on Sunday mornings in the chapel.

Innovations 
Congregation Beth Israel has added a few innovations to services:
A monthly Friday night Shabbat family service that is aimed at children and young families.
Rabbi Stephen Fuchs has initiated an alternative Yom Kippur service, in addition to the regular service, in order to better serve the modern congregation.
One service a month using the older New Union Prayer (as opposed to the newer Gates of Prayer) in order to better serve the members who preferred the earlier book.
On June 28, 2019, Congregation Beth Israel held their first Pride Shabbat service.

Education

General 
Beth Israel has educational opportunities for all ages and types of congregants. The cantor holds the role of director of education.

Youth Education Program 
The Youth Education Program is for children preschool through 7th grade. It teaches Jewish values, history, and traditions. Additionally, conversational Hebrew and prayer reading in Hebrew is taught. Students also attend Sunday morning services where they learn basic Jewish prayers.

La'atid: Learning For Life 
La'atid is a lifelong learning program for families and adults, the point of which is to continue Jewish education and promote knowledge and spirituality.

Noah's Ark 
Noah's Ark was Congregation Beth Israel's pre-school and early care and education program. In early 2014, the Congregation established a Task Force to find a solution to the financial challenge of the program and still allow for the continuation of quality childcare. Educational Playcare, a Connecticut-based provider of childcare and pre-school programs, became the new provider of child care programs in June 2014.

Torah study 
Beth Israel holds weekly Torah study at the synagogue, usually just prior to Saturday morning Shabbat services (see Worship). About 20-30 congregants participate each week and the session last about an hour. Torah study sessions are led by a rabbi at Beth Israel.

New American education 
The New American Committee provides educational opportunities including lectures and weekly language classes to Soviet immigrants (see History).

Ellen Jeanne Goldfarb Community Learning Center 

Funded with the help of private donors, the Jewish Federation of Greater Hartford and the Hartford Foundation of Public Giving, the Ellen Jeanne Goldfarb Community Learning Center opened in April, 2008.

Facilities 
The new learning center has a number of facilities, including the Deborah Library, which boasts over 13,000 lendable volumes, the Miller Media Center, a children's room, and the Abraham J. Feldman Museum and Archives where artifacts are stored from the past 160 years.

See also 
Oldest synagogues in the United States
National Register of Historic Places listings in West Hartford, Connecticut
Universal Health Care Foundation of Connecticut

References

External links 
Synagogue website
National Register of Historic Places
Ellen Jeanne Goldfarb Community Learning Center

Synagogues in Connecticut
Buildings and structures in West Hartford, Connecticut
Reform synagogues in Connecticut
Founding members of the Union for Reform Judaism
German-American culture in Connecticut
German-Jewish culture in the United States
National Register of Historic Places in Hartford County, Connecticut
Synagogues on the National Register of Historic Places in Connecticut
Religious organizations established in 1843
1843 establishments in Connecticut
Synagogues completed in 1936
Synagogues completed in 1933
1933 establishments in Connecticut
Art Deco architecture in Connecticut
Byzantine Revival architecture in Connecticut
Art Deco synagogues
Byzantine Revival synagogues